The 2007 Giro di Lombardia is the 101st edition of this single day road bicycle racing monument race. The 242 km event took place on 20 October 2007 and was won by Damiano Cunego, the Italian rider for Lampre–Fondital in 5 hours, 52 minutes 48 seconds at an average speed of 41.16 km/h.

General standings 
20 October 2007, 242 km

References

2007 UCI ProTour
Giro di Lombardia
2007